Lacusovagus (meaning "lake wanderer") is a genus of azhdarchoid pterodactyloid pterosaur from the Lower Cretaceous of Brazil. It is based on SMNK PAL 4325, a partial upper jaw comprising sections of the skull in front of the eyes. This specimen was found in rocks of the Early Cretaceous-age (probably Aptian stage, about 120 million years ago) Nova Olinda Member of the Crato Formation. The skull was long, and unusually wide. The section in front of the combined nasal-antorbital fenestra was relatively short. Also unusual was the combination of its toothless jaws and no bony head crest. Lacusovagus was described in 2008 by Mark Witton.

Lacusovagus shares many characteristics with the basal azhdarchoid family Chaoyangopteridae, and preliminary studies suggested it was a member of that clade. However, in 2017, a phylogenetic analysis found it to be within the genus Tupuxuara, a member of the Thalassodromidae.

See also
 List of pterosaur genera
 Timeline of pterosaur research
 Pterosaur size

References

External links
Informal discussion of Lacusovagus by its describer

Chaoyangopterids
Early Cretaceous pterosaurs of South America
Cretaceous Brazil
Fossils of Brazil
Crato Formation
Fossil taxa described in 2008